Sambuca is an alcoholic drink.

Sambuca may also refer to:
Sambuca (siege engine), ancient naval weapon
Sambuca (musical instrument), an ancient stringed instrument
Sambuca or sambuca rotata, a hurdy-gurdy, a hand-cranked stringed musical instrument from the Middle Ages
"Sambuca" (song), a song by British garage act Wideboys
Sambuca di Sicilia, comune in Sicily, Italy
Sambuca Pistoiese, comune in Tuscany, Italy
Sambuca Kelly, fictional character in UK TV series Waterloo Road
Sambucus, botanical genus containing the elder and elderberry.
Katya Sambuca (b. 1991), Russian singer, actress, model and television presenter.